"J'irai où tu iras" (meaning "I'll Go Where You Go") is a French-language duet between Celine Dion and Jean-Jacques Goldman from Dion's album, D'eux (1995). It was released as a promotional single in Quebec in May 1996. The track was written and produced by Jean-Jacques Goldman.

Background and release
There was no video made for the song. Dion performed this song many times during her concerts and TV shows. She sang it as a live duet also with Garou, Luck Mervil and her band members. During the D'eux Tour and the Let's Talk About Love World Tour the singer/songwriter Jean-Jacques Goldman came on stage during the Paris concerts to sing the song together with Dion. She performed it during her 2008–2009 Taking Chances World Tour and during her historic performance in front of 250,000 spectators to celebrate Quebec's 400th anniversary, which was included on Céline sur les Plaines DVD in 2008. During the latter concert, she sang it in Quebec together with Nanette Workman. In 2013, the song was performed during the Sans attendre Tour and the Celine...une seule fois concert; during the latter, the song was performed with Quebecois singer, Jean-Marc Couture.

The song was featured on Céline Dion's greatest hits compilation On ne change pas (2005). Live versions were a part of four other albums: Live à Paris (1996), Au cœur du stade (1999), and Taking Chances World Tour: The Concert French edition (2010 with Marc Langis, the bassist in Dion's band, singing Jean-Jacques Goldman's part), and Céline une seule fois / Live 2013 (2014 with Jean-Marc Couture singing Jean-Jacques Goldman's part).

"J'irai où tu iras" entered the Quebec Airplay Chart on 11 May 1996 and peaked at number 14. It stayed fourteen weeks on the chart. In July 2017, during Dion's 2017 tour, the song entered the French Digital Singles Chart at number 183 and the French Sales Chart at number 184. In October 2019, "J'irai où tu iras" reached new peaks on the French Digital Singles Chart (number 40) and the French Sales Chart (number 39).

Charts

References

External links

1996 singles
1996 songs
Celine Dion songs
Columbia Records singles
French-language songs
Jean-Jacques Goldman songs
Songs written by Jean-Jacques Goldman
Male–female vocal duets